The following lists events in the year 1986 in China.

Incumbents
General Secretary of the Communist Party: Hu Yaobang
President: Li Xiannian
Premier: Zhao Ziyang
Vice President: Ulanhu
Vice Premier: Wan Li

Governors  
 Governor of Anhui Province – Wang Yuzhao
 Governor of Fujian Province – Hu Ping then Wang Zhaoguo 
 Governor of Gansu Province – Chen Guangyi then Jia Zhijie
 Governor of Guangdong Province – Ye Xuanping 
 Governor of Guizhou Province – Wang Zhaowen
 Governor of Hebei Province – Zhang Shuguang then Xie Feng
 Governor of Heilongjiang Province – Hou Jie 
 Governor of Henan Province – He Zhukang 
 Governor of Hubei Province – Huang Zhizhen then Guo Zhenqian  
 Governor of Hunan Province – Xiong Qingquan 
 Governor of Jiangsu Province – Gu Xiulian 
 Governor of Jiangxi Province – Ni Xiance then Wu Guanzheng  
 Governor of Jilin Province – Gao Dezhan 
 Governor of Liaoning Province – Quan Shuren then Li Changchun 
 Governor of Qinghai Province – Song Ruixiang then Jin Jipeng
 Governor of Shaanxi Province – Li Qingwei then Zhang Boxing 
 Governor of Shandong Province – Li Chang'an then Jiang Chunyun 
 Governor of Shanxi Province – Wang Senhao 
 Governor of Sichuan Province – Jiang Minkuan (until January), Zhang Haoruo (starting February)
 Governor of Yunnan Province – Li Jiating 
 Governor of Zhejiang Province – Xue Ju (until January), Shen Zulun (starting February)

Events
 Unknown date – Lianyuan Welding Material, as predecessor of Sany (Sanyi Heavy Industry), one of the leading heavy equipment brands in the world, was founded in Hunan Province.

Births
 12 October – Li Wenliang

See also 
 1986 in Chinese film

 
China
Years of the 20th century in China
1980s in China
China